The 2013 African Women's Handball Cup Winners' Cup was the 29th edition, organized by the African Handball Confederation, under the auspices of the International Handball Federation, the handball sport governing body. The tournament was held from April 18–27, 2013 in Hammamet, Tunisia, contested by 9 teams and won by Atlético Petróleos de Luanda of Angola.

Draw

Preliminary rounds

Times given below are in CET UTC+1.

Group A

* Note:  Advance to quarter-finals

Group B

* Note:  Advance to quarter-finals

Knockout stage
Championship bracket

5-8th bracket

Final standings

See also 
2013 African Women's Handball Champions League

References

External links 
 CAHB official website

African Women's Handball Cup Winner's Cup
2013 in African handball